Volcanoes: Life on the Edge is a 1996 interactive CD-ROM published by Corbis. It recounts the expeditions by photojournalist Roger Russmeyer to volcanoes around the world.

Discover Magazine deemed it a satisfying title about Earth science. Technology Review deemed the title both the most conventional and arresting of Corbis' output. Newsweek described the project as "well-wrought". The Washington Post deemed it a first-rate CD-ROM documentary. The Sydney Morning Herald disliked the "humdrum photo-essays about low-key eruptions".

MacUser praised the well-organised interface while Popular Science enjoyed the "stunning" photographs. MacWorld gave the game 7.2/10.

Development
The game was announced in December 1995.

References

1996 video games
Educational video games
Video games developed in the United States
Windows games
Classic Mac OS games
Single-player video games